Paul White (born 7 December 1982) is an English-born former professional rugby league footballer who played in the 2000s and 2010s.

In 2011, for the beginning of a rugby union season, Paul tried his hand at rugby union for Preston Grasshoppers scoring 6 tries in 6 games.

Representative career 
Paul White played, and scored a try in Jamaica's 26–36 defeat by United States in the 2010 Atlantic Cup at Hodges Stadium, Jacksonville, Florida on Tuesday 16 November 2010.

References 

1982 births
Black British sportsmen
English people of Jamaican descent
English rugby league players
Halifax R.L.F.C. players
Huddersfield Giants players
Jamaica national rugby league team captains
Jamaica national rugby league team players
Jamaican rugby league players
Keighley Cougars players
Living people
Preston Grasshoppers R.F.C. players
Rugby league five-eighths
Rugby league fullbacks
Rugby league halfbacks
Rugby league hookers
Rugby league players from Bradford
Rugby league wingers
Rugby union players from Bradford
Salford Red Devils players
Wakefield Trinity players